The 2004 World Table Tennis Championships – men's team (Swaythling Cup) was the 47th edition of the men's team championship.  

China won the gold medal defeating Germany 3–0 in the final. South Korea won the bronze medal.  The International Table Tennis Association introduced a new format for the second stage of the tournament.

Medalists

First stage

Group A

Group B

Final stage

Final

Final 4 bracket

See also
 List of World Table Tennis Championships medalists

References

-